Behshahr County (Šahrestân-e Behšahr; , Ašref-e-Šahrestun) is in Mazandaran province, Iran on the Caspian Sea. The capital of the county is the city of Behshahr. At the 2006 census, the county's population was 154,957 in 40,432 households. The following census in 2011 counted 155,247 people in 46,100 households. At the 2016 census, the county's population was 168,769 in 55,140 households.

Administrative divisions

The population history of Behshahr County's administrative divisions over three consecutive censuses is shown in the following table. The latest census shows two districts, five rural districts, and three cities.

See also
 Amirabad Port
 Miankaleh peninsula

References

 

Counties of Mazandaran Province